Isabel Ordaz Luengo (born 11 March 1957) is a Spanish actress. She has appeared in more than 50 films and television shows since 1982. She won the Silver St. George for Best Actress for her role in Chevrolet at the 20th Moscow International Film Festival. She appeared in the TV series La que se avecina until 2017.

Selected filmography
 Chevrolet (1997)
 Todo mujer (2017)

References

External links

1957 births
Living people
Spanish film actresses
Actresses from Madrid
20th-century Spanish actresses
21st-century Spanish actresses